Linfield station was a former train station in Royersford, Pennsylvania. It served as a station for the Reading Company's Main Line until it closed. It was also known as Limerick station when the current village of Linfield had the same name.

References 

Former Reading Company stations
Former railway stations in Montgomery County, Pennsylvania
Railway stations closed in 1978
Former SEPTA Regional Rail stations